Andrew G. Morrow  (died 1982), was chief of surgery at the National Heart Institute, who established the septal myectomy operation for obstructive hypertrophic cardiomyopathy.

References

1898 births
1982 deaths
American surgeons
Colorectal surgeons
20th-century surgeons
People from Indianapolis
Date of birth missing